Proverbs 24 is the 24th chapter of the Book of Proverbs in the Hebrew Bible or the Old Testament of the Christian Bible. This chapter specifically records "the sayings of wise".

Text
The original text is written in Hebrew language. This chapter is divided into 34 verses.

Textual witnesses
Some early manuscripts containing the text of this chapter in Hebrew are of the Masoretic Text, which includes the Aleppo Codex (10th century), and Codex Leningradensis (1008).

There is also a translation into Koine Greek known as the Septuagint, made in the last few centuries BC. Extant ancient manuscripts of the Septuagint version include Codex Vaticanus (B; B; 4th century), Codex Sinaiticus (S; BHK: S; 4th century), and Codex Alexandrinus (A; A; 5th century).

Analysis
Verses 1–22 is a part of the third collection in the book of Proverbs (comprising Proverbs 22:17–24:22), which consists of seven instructions of various lengths:
 1st instruction (22:17–23:11)
 2nd instruction (23:12–18)
 3rd instruction (23:19–21)
 4th instruction (23:22–25)
 5th instruction (23:26–24:12)
 6th instruction (24:13–20) and 
 7th instruction (24:21–22)

The sayings are predominantly in the form of synonymous parallelism, preceded by a general superscription of the entire collection in 22:17a: "The words of the wise" (or "Sayings of the Wise"). This collection consists of an introduction that the youths should be instructed and exhorted to listen to and obey their "teachers" (parents), followed by a series of admonitions and prohibitions coupled with a variety of clauses, primarily presented in short parental instructions (cf. 23:15, 22; 24:13, 21).

The remaining verses of this chapter (24:23–34) form the fourth collection in the book, introduced by a superscription "These also are sayings of the wise" (24:23a).

Sayings of the Wise (24:1–22)
This section concludes a collection titled "Sayings of the Wise" (22:17), with 3 sets of instruction, one as a continuation from Proverbs 23:16.until 24:12, followed by 24:13–20 and 24:21–22. The instructions are likely given by a teacher in the context of a royal school during the monarchical period. The Greek Septuagint version contains five additional verses after verse 22, mainly on 'the wrath of
the king'.

Verse 3
Through wisdom is a house built
and by understanding it is established;
The 'building of the house' in verses 3-4 parallels to the building of the house by woman Wisdom in Proverbs 9:1, here stating that wisdom is 'the key to the prosperity of the family', as well as 'the key to healthy and harmonious family relationships'.

Verse 16
For a righteous man may fall seven times
And rise again,
But the wicked shall fall by calamity.
"For": is translated from the Hebrew clause , ki,  which position at the beginning of the sentence could be interpreted as 'temporal, conditional, or emphatic'; that is 'the righteous keep getting up and going again'

Further sayings of the Wise (24:23–34)
The whole section is the fourth collection in the book of Proverbs, consisting of:
a superscription (24:23a; "These also are sayings of the wise")
 a discourse on judgment (24:23b-26, 28–29), and 
 an autobiographical discourse on household labor (24:27, 30–34).

The first part of the collection (verses 23–29) contains warnings against partiality when judging (verses 23–25) or false testimony when being a witness (verse 28; cf. 18:5; 28:21). The second part (verses 30–34) provides an example story of being lazy and its consequences (cf. 7:6–23) reinforcing the lesson of the dilligent ant in 6:10-11. The instruction is given as such so it can be perceived 'through the eye as well as the ear' ('saw... considered... received instruction', verse 32).

Verse 28
Be not a witness against your neighbor without cause, and do not deceive with your lips.
"Without cause": this expression could mean 'without necessity' (mischievously) or 'without grounds' (falsely), either of them amounts to perjury (verse 28b).

Uses
The fry boats' bottom of In-N-Out Burger has the text "PROVERBS 24:16", which refers to the 16th verse of this chapter.

See also

Related Bible parts: Psalm 7, Proverbs 9, Proverbs 18, Proverbs 22, Proverbs 23, Proverbs 28

References

Sources

External links
 Jewish translations:
 Mishlei - Proverbs - Chapter 24 (Judaica Press) translation [with Rashi's commentary] at Chabad.org
 Christian translations:
 Online Bible at GospelHall.org (ESV, KJV, Darby, American Standard Version, Bible in Basic English)
 Book of Proverbs Chapter 24 King James Version
  Various versions

24